The Los Angeles Express was a newspaper published in Los Angeles in the late 19th and early 20th centuries. Founded in 1871, the newspaper was acquired by William Randolph Hearst in 1931. It merged with the Los Angeles Herald and became an evening newspaper known as the Los Angeles Herald-Express.  A 1962 combination with Hearst's morning Los Angeles Examiner resulted in its final incarnation as the evening Los Angeles Herald-Examiner.

History
The Los Angeles Express was Los Angeles's oldest newspaper published under its original name until it combined with the Los Angeles Herald. It was established on March 27, 1871, by five printers, Jesse Yarnell, George Yarnell, George A. Tiffany, J.W. Payton, and Miguel Veredo.

A stock company was organized in March 1875, with J. J. Ayers and Joseph Lynch as directors and proprietors.

In 1876 William Halley was the publisher. In 1873 the editor was James J. Ayers, who resigned in October to run for Los Angeles justice of the peace, stating that it would be incompatible to do both jobs at the same time. In 1879 Ayers was owner and editor.
In 1882, Ayers severed his connection with the newspaper and was appointed state printer. He was back as "proprietor" again until February 1896 or shortly before.

The "name, goodwill and business" of the Los Angeles Evening Express was sold in 1884 by Ayers and Lynch to H.Z. Osborne and E.R. Cleveland, owners of the evening Republican. "The consideration is understood to be $7,500." The resulting newspaper was the Evening Express and Republican, published daily except Sunday, with the subscription rate of 15 cents a week.

H.Z. Osborne came to Los Angeles from Bodie, Mono County, in May 1884 and bought the Republican, an evening newspaper that had been started by the Herald. In August he bought the Express and combined the two into one paper, running it along with E.R. Cleveland.

In 1886 a stock company was formed, led by Osborne, as editor, Cleveland and John M. Davies. Later, C.C. Allen purchased an interest.

In 1889, Osborne was identified as "chief owner" of the Express.

A company headed by C.D. Willard, secretary of the Los Angeles Chamber of Commerce, took over the ownership in March 1897, and Willard became editor. Fred L. Alles was named business manager.

Notable employees

 Robert W. Kenny, later state attorney general
 Dave Stannard, Los Angeles City Council member, 1942–43
 John Kenneth Turner, publisher, journalist, and author

References

Newspapers published in Greater Los Angeles
Defunct newspapers published in California
Publications established in 1871
1871 establishments in California
19th century in Los Angeles
Publications disestablished in 1931
1931 disestablishments in California